Ivy usually refers to any plant species in the genus Hedera, in the family Araliaceae - notably common ivy Hedera helix.

Ivy may also refer to other plant species:-
 Boston ivy Parthenocissus tricuspidata      
 cape ivy Senecio angulatus and Senecio tamoides
 coliseum ivy, Kenilworth ivy, Oxford ivy, Cymbalaria muralis
 devil's ivy Epipremnum aureum
 fig ivy (or creeping fig or climbing fig) Ficus pumila
German ivy Delairea odorata
 German ivy Senecio mikanioides
 grape ivy Parthenocissus tricuspidata
 ground ivy Glechoma hederacea
 ivy of Uruguay Cissus striata
 ivy tree Schefflera heptaphylla
 Japanese ivy Parthenocissus tricuspidata
 Natal ivy Senecio macroglossus
 parlour ivy Senecio mikanioides
 poison ivy Toxicodendron radicans
 purple ivy Rhododendron catawbiense
 red flame ivy Hemigraphis alternata
 Swedish ivy Plectranthus verticillatus
 switch ivy Leucothoe fontanesiana
 wax ivy Senecio macroglossus